SS Josephine Shaw Lowell was a Liberty ship built in the United States during World War II. She was named after Josephine Shaw Lowell, a Nineteenth century Progressive Reform leader and creator of the National Consumers League.

Construction
Josephine Shaw Lowell was laid down on 19 February 1944, under a Maritime Commission (MARCOM) contract, MC hull 2296, by J.A. Jones Construction, Panama City, Florida; she was launched on 4 April 1944.

History
She was allocated to Luckenbach Steamship Co., Ltd., on 3 May 1944. On 31 May 1946, she was laid up in the National Defense Reserve Fleet, in the Hudson River Group. On 15 January 1947, she was transferred to the Italian Government, which in turn sold her for $545,601.37 to Societe Italiana di Navigazione, Albaro, Genoa, Italy, on 22 January 1947, for commercial use. She was renamed Albaro. In 1963, she was sold to Aegean Cia. Nav., Panama, and renamed Aigaion. She was scrapped in Osaka, Japan, in 1968.

References

Bibliography

 
 
 
 
 

 

Liberty ships
Ships built in Panama City, Florida
1944 ships
Hudson River Reserve Fleet
Liberty ships transferred to Italy